"Contest" is the third episode of the first series of British sitcom Bottom. It was first broadcast on Tuesday 1 October 1991.

Synopsis
With Eddie having spent most of their remaining £11.80 on a second-hand copy of Parade magazine, he and Richie spend a night watching Miss World on the television.

Plot
The episode begins with Richie placing his head in the oven in a suicide attempt. He has left a suicide note on the table for Eddie to read. It is revealed that this is in fact a ploy to guilt-trip Eddie into buying him a drink. Eddie enters the room, places his briefcase on top of the note and proceeds to read the newspaper. When he notices Richie with his head in the oven, he shrugs indifferently, and Richie relents.

It emerges that while Eddie has been out at the office trying to claim his dole money, Richie has spent all day making an inexpensive dinner for the pair (everything has been grown, found or foraged), which turns out to be inedible. Eddie refuses to eat the dinner and reveals he has been denied his dole as he has too much in savings - £11.80, which ought to last him two months - but he's "invested" the majority of it in a secondhand copy of Parade magazine. Eddie sits down to watch the Miss World contest on TV, but Richie refuses to let him. The two have an argument and Richie throws Eddie out of the flat. He then settles down to masturbate while watching Miss World. Eddie, who has been preparing to apologise to Richie, catches Richie in the act and agrees to keep it a secret if he is allowed to return and watch Miss World.

Later, Richie puts two and two together when he realizes that Eddie has only 30p left, and yet the Parade copy only cost £1.50 of his £11.80, which should leave him £10.30. When Richie confronts Eddie, he reveals he has also placed a Miss World bet. Richie is less than impressed when he finds out Eddie has placed the money on the hideous, apparently ancient Chinese contestant, as he felt the odds were so good.

The pair must then deal with changing a fuse when Richie breaks the television. In the ensuing chaos, Richie is electrocuted, burns his hand on the kettle several times (exclaiming "I didn't think the kettle would be hot!") and falls out of the window. When Eddie fixes the lights, he notices Richie is gone. Only now does he find the suicide note and assumes Richie has killed himself. After briefly mourning his friend, he begins planning to sell all of his possessions.

Richie returns and the two discuss their state in the world. Eddie states his philosophy on life: "You get born, you keep your head down and you die. If you're lucky." Their contestant loses Miss World, and Richie is further depressed. Eddie reveals that he never placed the bet anyway; he only claimed to have done it so Richie would insist they watch Miss World. Eddie had instead spent the money on a "slap-up grill" as he saw Richie preparing "dinner" when he left that morning. The episode ends with Richie punching Eddie in the face.

Notes
This episode was filmed in June 1990 and was originally the pilot. As a result, there are several differences in the set, such as the piano being against the "fourth" wall and the stairs ascending in the opposite direction. Rik Mayall has shorter hair and Ade Edmondson has more hair and is lacking sideburns.
This is one of three episodes to feature only Richie and Eddie, the others being Culture and Hole.
This episode is omitted from some European DVD box sets.

Errors
It is revealed that the flat belongs to Richie's Auntie Mabel and that Eddie is Richie's sub-tenant, though he has never paid rent. However, from 's Up onwards, the pair have a landlord, Mr. Harrison. Auntie Mabel isn't mentioned again until Weapons Grade Y-Fronts Tour, when Richie mentions that his "auntie pays the rent."
The vintage magazine Eddie is holding when he is standing in the hallway is placed with the front cover facing the viewer. When he re-enters the room, the shot that follows immediately, the magazine is suddenly reversed with the back of the sleeve now facing the audience.

References

External links

Bottom (TV series)
1991 British television episodes